Tatköy, Korkuteli is a village in the District of Korkuteli, Antalya Province, Turkey. 

In 1997 IUCN Red List of Threatened Plants several plants in the region were mentioned. Between 2004 and 2006, another study was carried out in region of Tatkoy and Konya, it listed species as 'Endangered' - Clypeola ciliata (Boiss) and Silene lycaonica (Chowdh). Also listed as 'Vulnerable' were Iris stenophylla and Centaurea bourgaei (Boiss).

References

Villages in Korkuteli District